Instruments of Darkness is a BBC Books original novel written by Gary Russell and based on the long-running British science fiction television series Doctor Who. It features the Sixth Doctor and Mel.

This novel concludes a trilogy concerning the Pale Man and the Irish Twins which began in Russell's The Scales of Injustice and  Business Unusual. Evelyn Smythe, the Sixth Doctor's companion from the Big Finish Productions audio plays, also appears.

External links

2001 British novels
2001 science fiction novels
Past Doctor Adventures
Sixth Doctor novels
Novels by Gary Russell
BBC Books books